Communist Party of the Peoples of Spain is a Marxist–Leninist communist party in Spain. PCPE was founded out of the unification of several Marxist-Leninist factions. The youth organization is called the Communist Youth of the Peoples of Spain.

History
From 13–15 December 1984 a "Communist Unity Congress" was held in Madrid. Partido Comunista de España Unificado (PCEU, Unified Communist Party of Spain), Movimiento de Recuperación del PCE (MRPCE, Movement for the Recuperation of the PCE), Movimiento para la Recuperación y Unificación del PCE (MRUPCE, Movement for the Recuperation and Unification of the PCE), Candidatura Comunista (CC, Communist Candidature), and some minor groups unified themselves, thus creating Partido Comunista (renamed PCPE in 1986).

All these groups had surged from splits from the Communist Party of Spain (PCE) during the 1970s and 1980s. Quickly after its foundation, PCPE was recognized by some other parties, such as the Communist Party of the Soviet Union and other statebearing Eastern bloc parties. The party was formed by those who were against Santiago Carrillo's Eurocommunist line in the PCE. The Catalan referent of PCPE was initially Party of Communists of Catalonia (PCC), but it later broke with PCPE and now the Catalan referent is the Communist Party of the Peoples of Catalonia.

PCPE briefly joined Izquierda Unida in 1987. In 2000, the Spanish Communist Workers' Party (PCOE) merged with PCPE, and the publication of the united party became Unidad y Lucha.

In 2021 the PCPE is forming a coalition with the reconstituted Spanish Communist Workers' Party (PCOE) for the Madrid regional election as the Coalition for Communist Unity.

2017 split 
In April 2017 the PCPE suffered a major split. During the fifth plenary session of the central committee a minority of the committee recognized Ástor García as the new secretary general of the party, however a majority continued to recognize the incumbent (since 2002) secretary general Carmelo Suárez. The group around Ástor García created a new competing website of the PCPE.

Both PCPE-Suárez and PCPE-García were recognized by different communist parties as the legitimate PCPE. A majority of the Collectives of Communist Youth membership pledged allegiance to PCPE-García.

For the next two years both groups would compete for the PCPE name and international recognition. This dispute was finally resolved in March 2019 when the PCPE-García relinquished its claim to the PCPE name and renamed itself to the Communist Party of the Workers of Spain (Partido Comunista de los Trabajadores de España, PCTE).

Publications 
PCPE publishes Unidad y Lucha and Propuesta Comunista (a theoretical journal). Before the PCOE-PCPE merger, the main publication of the party was Nuevo Rumbo.

Electoral performance

Cortes Generales

Gallery

See also

List of political parties in Spain

References

External links
PCPE website 1

1984 establishments in Spain
Political parties established in 1984
Communist parties in Spain
Far-left politics in Spain
Republican parties in Spain
International Meeting of Communist and Workers Parties